is a hotel in Miyagino-ku, Sendai, Miyagi Prefecture. The hotel is adjacent to the JR East underground Tsutsujigaoka Station. The twelve-story structure includes a large three-story circular hall with seating for up to 2710 people, which is used as a concert hall and sports venue. It also contains a conference hall, day-care center, wedding facilities and a hotel with 74 rooms. The building was completed in March 1993.

See also
Nakano Sun Plaza
Hiroshima Sun Plaza

External links
 

Hotels in Sendai
Music venues in Japan
Sports venues in Sendai
Hotel buildings completed in 1993
1993 establishments in Japan